Operation Chavín de Huántar was a military operation in which a team of 142 commandos of the Peruvian Armed Forces ended the 1997 Japanese embassy hostage crisis by raiding the Japanese ambassador's residence and freeing the hostages held there by the terrorist organization Túpac Amaru Revolutionary Movement (MRTA). It is considered one of the most successful hostage rescues in world history.

Operation

Preparation
The name Chavín de Huántar was chosen for the operation because to make the incursion possible, tunnels were to be dug under the ambassador's residence from adjacent buildings. Chavín de Huántar is an archeological site in the central highlands of Peru which is famous for its underground passageways.
It is said that President Alberto Fujimori himself came up with the name.

The rescue operation was prepared and exercised in an exact replica of the residence located at the nearby Chorrillos Military School; there the commandos practiced every detail of the operation, including the weight of the explosives to be used to open the floor of the residence.

Key to the operation was the intelligence provided by Luis Giampietri, admiral of the Peruvian Navy at the time and former commander of a special operations group. He received and distributed hundreds of bugged items in the building and himself communicated by radio with the Peruvian military.

Assault

Over the course of the assault on 22 April 1997, 19-year-veteran Colonel Juan Alfonso Valer Sandoval, 11-year-veteran Captain Raúl Jimenez Chávez, and Supreme Court Justice Dr. Carlos Giusti Acuna were killed. All fourteen of the rebels were killed by Peruvian commandos. The success of the operation was tainted by subsequent claims, backed by several witnesses, that at least three and possibly eight of the rebels had been summarily executed by the commandos after surrendering. There are also rumours that Vladimiro Montesinos, Chief of Military Intelligence, ordered the execution of Supreme Court Justice Dr. Carlos Giusti, the only hostage who died, and Francisco Tudela, who nonetheless survived, who were political rivals of Alberto Fujimori. Colonel Juan Valer was killed after being shot seven times while trying to protect Tudela (who was seriously injured as well) and Captain Raúl Jimenez was killed by a grenade thrown by the same rebel who killed Valer and injured Tudela. Supreme Court Justice Dr. Carlos Giusti Acuna was shot in the leg and died of his wounds.

Legal actions 
In 2002, the case was taken up by public prosecutors, but the Peruvian Supreme Court ruled that the military tribunals had jurisdiction. A military court later absolved them of guilt, and the "Chavín de Huántar" soldiers led the 2004 military parade. In response, MRTA family members filed suit in 2003 at the Inter-American Commission on Human Rights (CIDH) accusing the Peruvian state of human rights violations, namely that the MRTA rebels had been denied "right to life, the right to judicial guarantees and the right to judicial protection". The CIDH accepted the case and is currently studying it.

Commemoration 

Alan García, then president of Peru, ruled that every year on April 22, the country would commemorate the day of "military bravery" in honor of the Operation Chavín de Huántar, considered one of the most successful military rescues in a hostage crisis in the world. The government of Ollanta Humala honored the soldiers who took part of the successful operation.

On April 19, 2017, the servicepeople who carried out the operation were awarded the Military Order of Ayacucho, Grand Cross grade, by the Peruvian president Pedro Pablo Kuczynski, according to Supreme Resolution Number 031-2017-DE. On April 21, 2017, Law Number 30554 was enacted by the Peruvian Congress, which proclaimed the Chavin de Huantar commandos "Heroes of Democracy".

References

Conflicts in 1997
Internal conflict in Peru
Military history of Peru
Operations involving Peruvian special forces
Hostage rescue operations
April 1997 events in South America